Joe Gallo (born February 8, 1980) is an American college basketball head coach and former player for the Merrimack Warriors men's basketball team. He was previously an assistant coach for Dartmouth and Robert Morris before he was hired as head coach at Merrimack in 2016.

Playing career
Gallo, a native of Milltown, New Jersey, played high school basketball at Princeton Day School before playing college basketball at Merrimack College.

Coaching career
Gallo began his coaching career in 2005 as an assistant at Merrimack a year after he was a player for the Warriors. In 2010, Gallo was hired as an assistant under head coach Paul Cormier at Dartmouth. He was hired as an assistant under Andrew Toole at Robert Morris 2012. In 2016, Gallo was hired as head coach at his alma mater, Merrimack, replacing Bert Hammel. After leading Merrimack to a Northeast Conference regular season title in 2020, its first season in Division I, Gallo was named conference coach of the year.

Head coaching record

References

External links
Merrimack Warriors bio

1980 births
Living people
American men's basketball players
Basketball coaches from New Jersey
Basketball players from New Jersey
College men's basketball head coaches in the United States
Dartmouth Big Green men's basketball coaches
Guards (basketball)
Merrimack Warriors men's basketball coaches
Merrimack Warriors men's basketball players
People from Milford, New Jersey
Princeton Day School alumni
Robert Morris Colonials men's basketball coaches
Sportspeople from Hunterdon County, New Jersey